José Gallego Mateo (19 March 1883 – 7 September 1910), known as Pepete III, was a Spanish matador.

Career 
(Gallego means "Galician," and there were no bullrings in Galicia at the time.)

After taking the alternativa in 1905, the right-hander appeared as a bullfighter in Spain and especially in Mexico. According to his contemporaries, he was brave and had a good technique, but he was seriously injured frequently—seven times throughout his five-year career as a matador.

On 7 September 1910, at the Murcia bullring during a mano a mano with the bullfighter , the first bull of the afternoon, "Estudiante" from the  ranch, knocked down a picador. Pepete rushed to help the picador, but the bull sunk his horn into the matador's right thigh, rupturing his femoral artery. Pepete died only a few minutes later at the bullring's infirmary.

References 

1883 births
1910 deaths
Spanish bullfighters
People from Seville
Bullfighters killed in the arena
Sport deaths in Spain